Porth Ceiriad is a south-east facing beach and bay in the parish of Llanengan, near to Abersoch, in the county of Gwynedd, North Wales. It has several interesting geological features.

References

Beaches of Gwynedd